For the 2002 ISSF World Cup in the seventeen Olympic shooting events, the World Cup Final was held in August 2002 in Munich, Germany for the rifle, pistol and running target events, and in October 2002 in Lonato, Italy for the shotgun events.

Rifle, pistol and running target
The winners in Munich were:
  Matthew Emmons, United States, in men's 50 m Rifle Three Positions
  Espen Berg-Knutsen, Norway, in men's 50 m Rifle Prone
  Li Jie, China, in men's 10 m Air Rifle
  Tan Zongliang, China, in men's 50 m Pistol
  Ralf Schumann, Germany, in men's 25 m Rapid Fire Pistol
  Mikhail Nestruev, Russia, in men's 10 m Air Pistol
  Zeng Goubin, China, in men's 10 m Running Target
  Shan Hong, China, in women's 50 m Rifle Three Positions
  Lioubov Galkina, Russia, in women's 10 m Air Rifle
  Tao Luna, China, in women's 25 m Pistol
  Tao Luna, China, in women's 10 m Air Pistol

Shotgun
The winners in Lonato were:
  Adam Vella, Australia, in men's Trap
  Li Shuangchun, China, in men's Double Trap
  James Graves, United States, in men's Skeet
  Gao E, China, in women's Trap
  Deborah Gelisio, Italy, in women's Double Trap
  Wei Ning, China, in women's Skeet

ISSF World Cup
World Cup
2002 in German sport
2002 in Italian sport
2000s in Munich
Sports competitions in Munich
Shooting competitions in Germany
Shooting competitions in Italy
October 2002 sports events in Europe